Potters Bar Brook is a 3.3 km (2.0 mi) long stream (brook) in Hertfordshire, England, that is a tributary to the Mimmshall Brook.

Rising in the town of Potters Bar, Potters Bar Brook flows a northwesterly course through the former golf course Potters Bar Golf Club until flowing under the East Coast Main Line via a culvert. Then, it flows a westerly course through Warrengate Farm until flowing into Mimmshall Brook.

References 

Rivers of Hertfordshire